Checker or chequer or variant, may refer to:

People
Chubby Checker (born 1941), American singer-songwriter best known for popularizing The Twist
 Tarasha Checker, prettiest girl in West Delhi

Arts, entertainment, and media
 Checker, a game piece in the board game Checkers (UK: draughts)
Checker Records, a record label

Brands and enterprises
Checker Motors Corporation, built Checker taxis
Checker Taxi, a taxi service founded by Morris Markin

Other uses
Check (pattern), also called checker or checkered, a pattern consisting of squares of alternating colors
Checker, the action that produces checkering, a surface applied to wooden gunstocks to provide a non-slip grip (see Gunsmith)

See also

Checkerboard
Checkers (disambiguation), including chequers
Check (disambiguation), including cheque
Draft (disambiguation), including draught